James Duncan was a Scottish footballer, who played for Eastern, Alexandra Athletic, Rangers and Scotland. After retiring as a player, Duncan served on the Rangers management committee.

References

Sources

External links

London Hearts profile

Year of birth missing
Year of death missing
Scottish footballers
Scotland international footballers
Association football fullbacks
Eastern F.C. players
Rangers F.C. players
Place of birth missing
Place of death missing
Rangers F.C. non-playing staff